Patherwa is a small village in Kushinagar district, previously Deoria district, Uttar Pradesh, India located near Fazilnagar. The place Kushinagar is known for Lord Budhha Mahaparinirvan sthali (an international place 25 km west from the Patherwa).

This village is situated at National Highway 28, 4 km distance from Fazilnagar and Bihar State (Samaur Bazar) is 9 km away from the village. The village has 2 Inter Colleges, Shri Nehru Inter College and Navjeevan Inter College. Also there is Yog Adhyapak prashikshan kendra (By. Yuwa Vikash Kalyan Samiti Kushinagar), Kanya High School and many primary and middle schools, a police station and Punjab National Bank. A government homeopathic hospital and many other private hospitals serve the village. This place has most of the people farming. This village is just at the side of the NH 28 in India.

References

Villages in Kushinagar district